Brandon Wagner (born April 3, 1987) is an American racing driver from Lafayette, Indiana. He is a graduate of Central Catholic High School and is currently enrolled at Purdue University.

Beginning in karting in 1999, he moved to USAC Midgets in 2004, competing for his father John's team. The family purchased a Firestone Indy Lights Series Dallara chassis in mid-2008 and he made his debut in the final race of the season at Chicagoland Speedway. He competed part-time in the 2009 season with the team being run in conjunction with Davey Hamilton and Kingdom Racing. He captured his first pole with Kingdom Racing on August 29, 2009 at Chicagoland Speedway but was involved in an early race accident and did not finish. Wagner made his 2010 debut in the Freedom 100 with Davey Hamilton/Kingdom Racing where he captured his best Indy Lights finish of 8th. The team continued running a partial season of ovals, similar to the schedule they ran in 2009. On October 2, 2010, Wagner captured his first win in the Firestone Indy Lights Series at Homestead Miami Speedway after passing polesitter Pippa Mann at the start and dueling with James Hinchcliffe for much of the race. Wagner continued part-time on ovals in 2011 with a best finish of fourth at Kentucky Speedway and finished fifteenth in points. He drove in the 2012 Freedom 100 for Team E, his only race of the season.

Racing record

American open–wheel racing results
(key)

Indy Lights

External links
Brandon Wagner Racing
Kingdom Racing Official Site

1987 births
Living people
Indy Lights drivers
Sportspeople from Lafayette, Indiana
Racing drivers from Indiana

Team Moore Racing drivers